Thazhecode  is a village in Kozhikode district in the state of Kerala, India.

Demographics
 India census, Thazhecode had a population of 21625 with 10508 males and 11117 females.

References

Villages in Kozhikode district
Kozhikode east